Killing Mad Dogs (romanized: Sagkoshi) is a 2001 Iranian drama film directed by Bahram Bayzai.

Plot
A businessman in late-1980s Tehran, Nasser Moasser, discovers that his partner has been laundering money and flees the city with the police on his trail. One year later, his wife, Golrokh Kamali, returns from a long absence to find that her husband is gone and that she has been left to resolve his many debts. Eventually, she meets with her husband's old partner, Javad Moghadam, and learns the truth about his disappearance.

Cast
 Mojdeh Shamsaie - Golrokh
 Majid Mozaffari - Nasser Moasser
 Reza Kianian - Javad Moghadam
 Dariush Arjmand - Hajji Naghdi
 Ahmad Najafi - Tayeri
 Mitra Hajjar - Fereshteh
 Hasan Pourshirazi

References

External links
 

2001 drama films
2001 films
2000s Persian-language films
Films directed by Bahram Bayzai
Iranian crime films